Kamla may refer to:

Mythology
 In Hinduism, Kamla is another name  of Lakshmi, consort of Vishnu. The name is derived from word Kamal, another name of Vishnu, and also meaning lotus in Sanskrit. Kamla is a common feminine given name, just as Padma, Kumud and Kumudini, all synonyms for Lotus. Kamla also gives rise another common masculine given name, Kamla Kant another name of Vishnu. Also written as Kamala
 Kamalatmika also known as Kamala, one of the ten Mahavidyas (Wisdom goddess) in Hinduism.

Places
Kamla Nagar, neighbourhood of Delhi, in the North Delhi district of Delhi, India
Kamla Nehru College for Women, Jodhpur, girls college situated in Jodhpur city in Indian state of Rajasthan, India
Kamla Nehru Institute of Technology (KNIT), a prominent state government funded engineering college in Uttar Pradesh, India
Kamla (Kwakwaka'wakw village), an indigenous village in, British Columbia, Canada

Other
Kamla (film), 1984 Hindi film
Kamla (name), given name and surname, includes a list of people with the name

See also

 Kamala (disambiguation)
 Kamela (disambiguation)
 Kalla (disambiguation)